Pirogov Russian National Research Medical University (formerly known as Russian State Medical University or RSMU) is a medical higher education institution in Moscow, Russia founded in 1906. It is fully accredited and recognized by Russia's Ministry of Education and Science and is under the authority of the Ministry of Health and Social Development. Named after Russian surgeon and pedagogue N.I. Pirogov (1810-1888)..

History

The revolutionary events of 1917 gave an incentive to a new wave in the history of HMCW. The "Interim Government Herald" (Vestnik Vremennogo Pravitelstva) informed about the legislation of the draft for the transformation of women courses into women universities. However no practical implementation of the legislation followed. On top of that, the study years 1917-1918 started off with huge complications and in November the studies were dismissed. On October 16, 1918, the People's Commisariat Board decreed to transform HMCW into 2nd Moscow State University (2nd MSU), thus becoming a new educational establishment of mixed character without considering the former a separate educational establishment.

2nd MSU existed up to 1930. Later on, as a result of reorganization 3 independent institutes came to existence including 2nd Moscow State Medical Institute (2nd MSMI). Then a period of progressive development started and lasted until the World War. This includes the formation of new departments and faculties. Each department had a scientific student society of its own. During the early days of war, when the state examinations were over after spring, practically all the graduates were sent to the Red Army Forces. Throughout all the years of war, the institute operated as usual and kept on training specialists. On November 23, 1946, on account of 40 years of its foundation, the USSR Presidium of the Supreme Soviet decree decided to honour the institute with the name  of I.V. Stalin. From that year onwards up to 1957, the institute was officially called "2nd MSMI named after I.V. Stalin".

And on May 30, 1957, as a dedication to its 50th year of foundation, the RSFSR Presidium of the Supreme Soviet decree honoured 2nd MSMI with the name of Russian surgeon and anatomist N.I. Pirogov. In 1966, on its 60th anniversary, the institute acquired a new name which was 2nd MOLSMI named after N.I. Pirogov.

Ratings
In 2014, the Russian rating agency "Expert RA" included it in its list of rated universities of higher educational of the Commonwealth of Independent States, assigning it a rating of "D".

Courses

Undergraduate
General Medicine:     6 years
Pediatrics:           6 years
Medical Biochemistry: 6 years
Medical Biophysics:   6 years
Medical Cybernetics:  6 years
Dentistry:            5 years
Pharmacy:             5 years
Clinical Psychology:  5 years
Social Work:          5 years

Clinical residency

	Obstetrics and Gynecology
	Dermatovenereology
	Ultrasonic diagnosis
	Plastic surgery
	Urology
	Allergology and immunology
	Anesthesiology and critical care medicine
	Hematology
	Pediatric endocrinology
	Cytology
	Neuroscience
	Neonatology
	Oncology
	ENT
	Ophthalmology
	Psychiatry and Addiction Medicine
	Forensic Pathology
	Gastroenterology
	Medical Genetics
	Family Medicine
	Pathology
	Psychiatry
	Psychotherapy
	Pulmonology
	Rheumatology
	Public Health
	Physical Therapy and Rehabilitation
	Pediatric surgery
	Endoscopic Surgery
	General Surgery
	Dental and Maxillofacial surgery
	Infectious diseases
	Cardiology
	Clinical pathology
	Clinical pharmacology
	Pediatrics
	Radiology
	Radiation oncology
	Internal Medicine
	Cardiovascular surgery
	Trauma and Orthopedic Surgery
	Endocrinology
	Clinical Physiology

Clinical Fellowships, Research, Teaching and Postdoctoral Positions

	Obstetrics and Gynaecology
	Anesthesiology and Critical Care Medicine
	ENT
	Internal medicine
	Gastroenterology
	Hematology
	Ophthalmology
	Pediatric surgery
	Dentistry
	Urology
	Trauma and Orthopedic Surgery
	Clinical Physiology
	General Surgery
	Infectious diseases
	Cardiology
	Clinical Immunology and Allergy
	Clinical pathology
	Dermatology and STDs
	Radiology
	Neurology
	Public health
	Medical Oncology
	Pathology
	Pediatrics
	Psychiatry and Addiction Medicine
	Pulmonology
	Rheumatology
	Cardiovascular Surgery
	Forensic Pathology
	Toxicology
	Clinical Pharmacology
	Endocrinology
	Sports medicine
	Physical Therapy and Rehabilitation
	Clinical Biochemistry
	Biology

Clinical internship training

	Internal Medicine
	Emergency Medicine
	Anesthesiology and Critical Care Medicine
	Obstetrics and Gynaecology
	Psychiatry
	General Surgery
	Paediatrics
	Radiology
	Dermatology and STDs
	Forensic Pathology
	Infectious diseases
	Pathology
	Neurology
	Neonatology
	Oncology
	Ophthalmology
	ENT
	Paediatric surgery
	Trauma and Orthopedic Surgery
	Public health
	Pulmonary Medicine

Administration

Academic Council
Superior Authority of Russian National Research Medical University is the Academic Council. The term of office of the Academic Council is for 5 years.

Rectorate
Rectorate is the executive authority of the university. At its head is the Rector, and the structure of administration also includes five vice-chancellors, two vice-rector for Academic Affairs, Vice-Rector, Vice Rector for Clinical Work, and Vice President for Quartermaster.

Rectors
 Vladimir Guerrier, 1872–1888, 1900–1905
 Sergey Chaplygin, 1905–1919
 Sergey Namyotkin, 1919–1924
 Albert Pinkevich, 1924–1930
 Eugene Tsukershteyn, 1930–1931
 Joseph Rybak, 1932–1936
 Love Basias, 1937
 Abraham Cot, 1937–1946
 Sergei Milovidov, 1946–1956
 Oleg Kerbikov, 1956–1958
 Maria Sirotkin, 1958–1964
 Yuri Lopukhin, 1965–1984
 Vladimir Yarygin, 1984–2007
 Nikolai Volodin, 2007–2011
 Natalia Polunina, 2011–2012
 Andrei Kamkin, 2013–2015
 Sergey Lukyanov, 2015–

Notable alumni
 Leonid Roshal - professor, MD, director of the Moscow Institute of Children's Emergency Surgery and Traumatology, member of Public Chamber of Russia, expert of the World Health Organization, Member of the Commission on Human Rights under President of Russian Federation, "Doctors of the World", "European of the Year" "Russian of the Year", "Star of Europe 2005", the president of the National Medical Chamber of Russia
 Vera Sidelnikov - professor, Doctor of Medical Sciences, Honored Scientist of Russia, laureate of the Russian Federation Government, the premium LS Persianinova
 Yakob D. Kahn - professor of urology in Moscow Medical Stomatological Institute, MD
 Michael Kechker - Soviet and Russian physician, cardiologist, MD, professor, academician of the Russian Academy of Medical and Technical Sciences, Honoured Doctor of the Russian Federation
 Georgy Znamensky (1903-1946) - Soviet athlete and prize winner of the USSR, Honored Master of Sports (1936), member of the CPSU (b) since 1941
 Serafim Ivanovich Znamensky (1906-1942) - Soviet athlete and prize winner of the USSR. Honored Master of Sports (1936)

Dr Muhamad Akmal Saleh, Youth Chief UMNO and Exco Health Anti Drug State Malacca

References

External links
  
 English version of the official website (Limited Content) 
 Listing in the Database of Ministry of Science and Education of the Russian Federation

Russian National Research Medical University
1906 establishments in the Russian Empire
Educational institutions established in 1906
Education in the Soviet Union
National research universities in Russia